Matilda II, Countess of Nevers (1234/35–1262), also known as Maud of Dampierre or Mathilda II of Bourbon, was a sovereign Countess of Nevers, Countess of Auxerre, Countess of Tonnerre.

Matilda was a daughter of Archambaud IX of Bourbon and Yolande de Châtillon, Countess of Nevers.  As heiress to the counties of Nevers, Auxerre and Tonnerre, she was married off to Odo, the eldest son of Hugh IV, Duke of Burgundy. This marriage was meant to reunite two important counties with the Duchy of Burgundy, but he predeceased his father, and so the duchy passed to his brother Robert II. The county of Nevers was partitioned(Nevers, Tonnerre, Auxerre) among her daughters over the period of ten years.

With Odo, Matilda had four daughters:
Yolande, Countess of Nevers (1247–1280), married (1) John Tristan, Count of Valois, and (2) Count Robert III of Flanders
Margaret, Countess of Tonnerre (1250–1308), married King Charles I of Naples
Adelaide, Countess of Auxerre (1251–1290), married John I of Chalon, Lord of Rochefort
Joan (1253–1271), died young

References

Bibliography

Counts of Auxerre
1241 births
1262 deaths
French countesses
French suo jure nobility
Countesses of Nevers
Counts of Nevers
House of Dampierre
House of Burgundy
13th-century women rulers
13th-century French people
13th-century French women